{{DISPLAYTITLE:C13H12N2O}}
The molecular formula C13H12N2O (molar mass: 212.25 g/mol, exact mass: 212.0950 u) may refer to:

 Harmine, a beta-carboline enzyme inhibitor
 1,3-Diphenylurea, a cytokinin plant hormone